Louis Ambrose Patrick D'Alpuget (1880-1957) was a pioneer rugby league player in the New South Wales Rugby League (NSWRL) competition who played for the Eastern Suburbs and Annandale clubs. Of French descent,  He played for New South Wales in the very first rugby match run by the newly created 'New South Wales Rugby Football League' which had just split away from the established New South Wales Rugby Football Union.

He was a member of Sydney's Eastern Suburbs first team, kicking the first ever goal for the club.

D'Alpuget was a member of the Eastern Suburbs side that was defeated by South Sydney in the NSWRL's first premiership final. D'Alpugent had just one season with the Eastern Suburbs club before joining the now defunct Annandale club. D'Alpuget's only representative match came in 1908 when he was selected for Sydney against a touring New Zealand Maori side.

A former rugby union player, D'Alpuget was a member of the rebel sides that played against the New Zealand 'All Golds' in the series that helped to establish rugby league in Australia. He was awarded Life Membership of the New South Wales Rugby League in 1914.

D'Alpuget was also a founding member of Bondi Surf Club.

He is remembered as the Sydney Roosters 4th ever player.

Lou d'Alpuget was the grandfather of noted author Blanche d'Alpuget.

Death

Lou D'Alpuget died at the Sydney Sports Ground  while watching Souths v's Norths on 6 July 1957. A well attended funeral took place at Rookwood Cemetery on 9 Jul 1957, mourners included Dally Messenger, Webby Neill and Harold Mathews.

References

 Alan Whiticker and Glen Hudson, The Encyclopedia Of Rugby League Players 
 Ian Heads, True Blue - the true story of the NSW Rugby League,

1880 births
1957 deaths
Australian people of French descent
Australian rugby league players
New South Wales rugby league team players
Rugby league five-eighths
Rugby league halfbacks
Sydney Roosters players